Juan Miguel B. "Juami" Tiongson (born February 5, 1991) is a Filipino professional basketball player for the Terrafirma Dyip of the Philippine Basketball Association (PBA). Tiongson was drafted by the Blackwater Elite twelfth overall in the 2014 PBA draft. He played college basketball at Ateneo de Manila University.

Professional career

Blackwater Elite (2014–2016) 
On August 24, 2014, Tiongson was drafted by the Blackwater Elite with its 12th overall pick in the 2014 PBA Rookie Draft. He played with them for 2 years, then was bought out.

NLEX Road Warriors (2017–2019) 
Later on, the NLEX Road Warriors gave him a new contract to play for them. He earned his first PBA Player of the Week with that team. On September 7, 2017, he was re-signed to a 2-year contract extension.

Columbian/Terrafirma Dyip (2019–present) 
On August 20, 2019, he was traded to the Northport Batang Pier for Michael Miranda. The next day, he was traded to the Columbian Dyip for Jerramy King. He started the Governor's Cup strong, scoring 11 points, 4 rebounds and 4 assists in his debut win against the Alaska Aces, then finished with 10 points, 4 rebounds, and 2 assists in a loss to the Rain or Shine Elastopainters. The team failed to make the playoffs, going 4–7. 

The next season, which was the 2020 Philippine Cup, the Terrafirma Dyip had a worse record, only winning one game. For this season, he averaged career highs in every statistic and played major minutes in all the elimination games.

In the 2021 Philippine Cup, the Dyip started off with a 0–4 record. Then in their 5th game against the San Miguel Beermen, Tiongson had a career-high 28 points in their 110–104 overtime win. He broke that career-high in the next game with 31 points on 9 of 15 threes in a 95–90 win against the Barangay Ginebra. For his efforts, he was given a Player of the Week Award. Despite this, the team failed to make the playoffs again, finishing 4–7 in 9th place. In the Governors' Cup, he had 27 points against Ginebra, but missed two free throws that could have given them the win. He missed the last game of their season due to an ankle sprain he had during practice. The Dyip did not make the playoffs for that conference either. 

Before the start of the 2022–23 PBA season, during the Leo Awards, Tiongson was awarded as the Most Improved Player. He dedicated the award to his mother. He became an unrestricted free agent on January 1, 2023, but he immediately signed a new two-year contract with the team on January 4.

PBA career statistics

As of the end of 2022–23 season

Season-by-season averages

|-
| align=left | 
| align=left | Blackwater
| 10 || 12.3 || .400 || .286 || .857 || 1.5 || .7 || .2 || .0 || 4.4
|-
| align=left | 
| align=left | Blackwater
| 10 || 8.2 || .348 || .300 || .600 || .5 || 1.2 || .3 || .0 || 2.2
|-
| align=left | 
| align=left | NLEX
| 23 || 15.6 || .383 || .324 || .810 || 1.6 || 1.3 || .6 || .2 || 6.7
|-
| align=left | 
| align=left | NLEX
| 41 || 16.5 || .368 || .326 || .741 || 1.7 || 2.2 || .5 || .0 || 5.5
|-
| align=left rowspan=2| 
| align=left | NLEX
| rowspan=2|32 || rowspan=2|18.5 || rowspan=2|.403 || rowspan=2|.343 || rowspan=2|.878 || rowspan=2|2.2 || rowspan=2|3.0 || rowspan=2|.8 || rowspan=2|.1 || rowspan=2|8.1
|-
| align=left | Columbian
|-
| align=left | 
| align=left | Terrafirma
| 11 || 27.7 || .433 || .396 || .889 || 2.4 || 3.1 || 1.5 || .0 || 13.4
|-
| align=left | 
| align=left | Terrafirma
| 21 || 33.1 || .406 || .379 || .778 || 2.9 || 3.3 || .9 || .0 || 16.4
|-
| align=left | 
| align=left | Terrafirma
| 31 || 33.9 || .438 || .383 || .828 || 3.4 || 3.0 || .9 || .1 || 18.1
|-class=sortbottom
| align=center colspan=2 | Career
| 179 || 21.7 || .408 || .358 || .814 || 2.2 || 2.4 || .7 || .1 || 9.8

References

1991 births
Living people
Ateneo Blue Eagles men's basketball players
Basketball players from Metro Manila
Blackwater Bossing draft picks
Blackwater Bossing players
Filipino expatriate basketball people in Malaysia
Filipino men's basketball players
Kuala Lumpur Dragons players
NLEX Road Warriors players
People from Mandaluyong
Point guards
Terrafirma Dyip players
Shooting guards